Franz Servais (1 March 1880 – 31 January 1966) was a Luxembourgian writer. His work was part of the literature event in the art competition at the 1924 Summer Olympics.

References

1880 births
1966 deaths
19th-century Luxembourgian writers
20th-century Luxembourgian writers
Olympic competitors in art competitions
People from Luxembourg City